Karl-Gustav Fredrik Olausson (born October 5, 1966) is a Swedish former ice hockey player from Nybro who is currently assistant coach for HV71 in Elitserien. He had previously played 17 seasons in the NHL and another 6 in Sweden.

He was a member of the 2002 Stanley Cup champion Detroit Red Wings.

Career 
Olausson is a retired defenseman who played with certainty and calmness, and was known for a good feel for the game. He represented Sweden for the first time on February 9, 1986, against the Soviets in Stockholm. He has won the Stanley Cup with the Detroit Red Wings in 2002, and played in the Stanley Cup finals in 2003 with Mighty Ducks of Anaheim.

Olausson was drafted in the 1985 NHL Entry Draft by Winnipeg Jets, with the 81st overall selection. During his career in NHL he has played for Winnipeg Jets, Edmonton Oilers, Mighty Ducks of Anaheim, Pittsburgh Penguins, and Detroit Red Wings.

During Elitserien playoffs in 2006, Olausson suffered a knee injury (torn ligament) in the third quarterfinal game with HV71 against Mora IK. He was able to continue play, although sparingly, in the playoffs using a specially designed knee protection.

After the season, Olausson moved back to Karlstad and in July 2006 he signed a one-year-contract with Färjestads BK, the same club that he played with between 1984 and 1986, before signing with the Jets.  Unfortunately, it was reported on February 27, 2007, that Olausson would have to retire due to serious illness (primary sclerosing cholangitis).  In December 2006, he reportedly underwent two surgeries and received a liver transplant in the summer of 2007.

He was named assistant coach of HV71 of the Swedish Elite League for the 2009–10 season.

Awards 
 Silver medal with Team Sweden at the 1986 Ice Hockey World Championships.
 Winner of the Swedish National Championship with Färjestads BK in 1986 and HV71 in 2004.
 Named to the Swedish World All-Star Team in 1986.
 Named Elitserien Rookie of the Year in 1986.
 Winter Olympics, 5th place, in 2002.
 Stanley Cup winner with Detroit Red Wings in 2002.

Career statistics

Regular season and playoffs

International

See also
List of NHL players with 1000 games played

References

External links 

Olausson reportedly to retire because of liver ailment

1966 births
Detroit Red Wings players
Edmonton Oilers players
Färjestad BK players
HV71 players
Ice hockey players at the 2002 Winter Olympics
Liver transplant recipients
Living people
Mighty Ducks of Anaheim players
Nybro Vikings players
Olympic ice hockey players of Sweden
People from Nybro Municipality
Pittsburgh Penguins players
Stanley Cup champions
SC Bern players
Swedish ice hockey defencemen
Swedish expatriate ice hockey players in Canada
Swedish expatriate sportspeople in Switzerland
Swedish expatriate ice hockey players in the United States
Winnipeg Jets (1979–1996) draft picks
Winnipeg Jets (1979–1996) players
Sportspeople from Kalmar County